Sherbourne Street is a roadway in Downtown Toronto.
It is one of the original streets in the old city of York, Upper Canada. It starts at Queen's quay, and heads north to South Drive. Its 2 lanes for the entire length, though the part south of Bloor has bike lanes.

It was named by Samuel Smith Ridout (son of Thomas Ridout) in 1845 after the town in Dorset, England; the Ridout family emigrated from Sherborne to Maryland in 1774. Before 1845 the short stretch from Palace Street (now Front Street East) to Duchess Street (now Richmond Street) was called Caroline Street.

History 
In 1838, following the Upper Canada Rebellion, seven blockhouses were built, guarding the approaches to Toronto, including the Sherbourne Blockhouse, built at the current intersection of Sherbourne and Bloor.

In the 19th Century Sherbourne was lined with the stately homes of many of Toronto's most prominent families, but by the 20th Century the remaining stately houses, like 230 Sherbourne Street, had been converted to rooming houses.

Streetcars ran down Sherbourne from 1874 (as horsecar service until electrified in 1891, then as Belt Line to 1923 and finally as Sherbourne streetcar line) to 1942. Buses did not begin on Sherbourne until 1947 and is now signed as 75 Sherbourne since 1957.

In the early 2000s City Council chose Sherbourne as one of the first streets in Toronto to be retrofitted with dedicated bike lanes.
In 2012 Sherbourne's bike lanes were improved, changing them from lanes separated from cars and trucks solely by painted lines to lanes with a pavement change that would warn motorists when they had strayed out of their lanes.

Landmarks

References

External links

Roads in Toronto